Malina is the fifth studio album by Norwegian progressive metal band Leprous, released on 25 August 2017 through Inside Out Music.

Malina is the first album to feature Robin Ognedal on guitar, and the first not to feature former guitarist Øystein Landsverk, who left the band after 13 years.

Promotion 
The track listing was revealed on 16 June 2017, with lead single "From the Flame" also being released that day. On 28 July 2017 a radio edit version of the song "Stuck" was released as the album second single. A music video for the third single "Illuminate" was unveiled on 17 August 2017.

Track listing

Personnel

Leprous 
 Einar Solberg – vocals, keyboards
 Tor Oddmund Suhrke – guitar
 Robin Ognedal – guitar
 Simen Børven – bass guitar
 Baard Kolstad – drums

Additional personnel 
 Raphael Weinroth-Browne – cello, strings
 David Castillo – production
 Jens Bogren – mixing

Charts

References 

2017 albums
Leprous albums
Inside Out Music albums